Churu may refer to

 Churu, Rajasthan, a city in India
 Churu district, the Indian district containing the city
 Churu (Lok Sabha constituency), an Indian constituciency
 Churu (Rajasthan Assembly constituency), part of the above
 Churu (Bolivia), a mountain in Bolivia
 Churu Pata, another mountain in Bolivia near the Churu
 Churu, Iran, a village in Iran
 Churu (cheese), a Tibetan cheese
 Churu (soup), a soup made with this cheese
 Churu people, an ethnic group in Vietnam
 Churu language, or Chru, a language of Vietnam

See also 
 Chru (disambiguation)
 Churul (disambiguation)
 Churup